Giovanni Bertorelli (7 December 1928 – 25 April 2006) was a Venezuelan fencer. He competed in the individual and team foil and épée events at the 1952 Summer Olympics.

References

External links
 

1928 births
2006 deaths
Venezuelan male épée fencers
Olympic fencers of Venezuela
Fencers at the 1952 Summer Olympics
Venezuelan male foil fencers